Edmond Baraffe (19 October 1942 – 19 April 2020) was a French professional football striker and manager.

References

External links
 
 
 Profile at fff.fr 
 Stats at weltfussball.de 

1942 births
1966 FIFA World Cup players
Association football forwards
France international footballers
French football managers
French footballers
US Boulogne players
Lille OSC players
2020 deaths
Red Star F.C. players
Toulouse FC players
Le Havre AC managers
US Boulogne managers
Ligue 1 players